Fred or Frederick Ellis may refer to:

 Fred Ellis (boxer) (1908–1963), South African boxer
 Fred Ellis (cartoonist) (1885–1965), American cartoonist
 Fred Ellis (racing driver) (1889–1958), American racecar driver
 Fred Ellis (footballer) (1900–1970), English footballer
 Fred E. Ellis, American general
 Frederick M. Ellis (1906–1967), American athlete, coach, professor, head football coach at Tufts University (1946–1952)
 Frederick S. Ellis (1830–1880), Wisconsin politician
 Frederick Startridge Ellis (1830–1901), English bookseller and author
 Frederick Vincent Ellis (1892–1961), New Zealand artist and art teacher
 Frederick Ellis (priest) (fl. 1926–1965), Canadian Anglican priest and Dean of Nassau
 Frederick Ellis, 7th Baron Howard de Walden (1830–1899), British landowner and peer